The Battle of Abukir (or Aboukir or Abu Qir) was a battle in which Napoleon Bonaparte defeated Seid Mustafa Pasha's Ottoman army on 25 July 1799, during the French campaign in Egypt. It is considered the first pitched battle with this name, as there already had been a naval battle on 1 August 1798, the Battle of the Nile. (A second pitched battle followed on 8 March 1801.) No sooner had the French forces returned from a campaign to Syria, than the Ottoman forces were transported to Egypt by Sidney Smith's British fleet to put an end to French rule in Egypt.

Seid Mustafa Pasha was an experienced commander who had fought against the Russians. He knew that cavalry charges against the French squares were futile. So, he sought to avoid them by fortifying his beachhead with two defensive lines. From this beachhead Mustafa could carry out the invasion of Egypt. However, Napoleon immediately saw the flaw in the tactic as it meant that the Turks had nowhere to run if routed.

The French attacked the Ottoman positions and quickly broke through the first defensive line before it was fully completed. The second line, however, proved tougher to defeat and the French withdrew for a while. At this point, cavalry general Murat saw his opportunity and attacked with his cavalry, quickly routing the exposed Turks.

Murat's charge was so rapid that he burst inside Mustafa's tent and captured the Turkish commander, severing two of the Turk's fingers with his sabre. In return, Mustafa shot Murat in the jaw. Immediately, Murat was operated on and resumed his duties the next day.

The Turkish army fled in panic. Some Ottomans drowned trying to swim to the British ships two miles away from shore, while others fled to Abukir castle, but they surrendered shortly thereafter. The Turkish army was annihilated, French losses were under 1,000. News of the victory reached France before Napoleon arrived in October and this made him even more popular, an important asset considering the troubles brewing in the French Directory. This battle temporarily secured France's control over Egypt.

Background

The Ottomans, at the insistence of Great Britain, had declared war on France. In the summer of 1798, Bonaparte led an expedition which took Egypt from the Ottomans. In 1799, two Ottoman armies were to attack Egypt: one carried by the British fleet, the other marching down from Anatolia into north Syria. As usual, Bonaparte chose to take the initiative. in February 1799 he marched north conquering Gaza, El Arish, and Jaffa, but was halted before the town of Acre (Saint-Jean-d'Acre) for two months of siege. Acre was defended by its governor, Djezzar Pasha, and Napoleon's former fellow student of the Ecole Militaire in Paris, Antoine de Phélippeaux, an engineer and master of artillery, now a British Colonel. In addition, the city was continually replenished with men, food, water, and other necessities by the British Navy. The French army being decimated by the plague, Napoleon ended his dreams of conquest in the East. He had dreamed of taking Constantinople and then invading India to take advantage of the local insurgency against the British. He also dreamed that once in Constantinople, he could return with his army to France through Vienna.

Aboukir is a small, thin peninsula jutting out of the Egyptian coastline, approximately ~35 kilometers north-west (due west) of Alexandria on the coastline. The peninsula overlooks bays on both of its side. The peninsula and fort occupy a strategic point, as they overlook the juncture that connects the isthmus that leads to Rosetta (east) and the isthmus that leads to Alexandria (west). Previously, this was only true for Alexandria. The lake south of Aboukir (sporadically referred to as Aboukir bay or lake of Aboukir or by its local name 'Lake Ma'adieh), came to existence in 1770 when the beachwall south-east of the peninsula was breached by high tides, flooding the large landmass. This made Aboukir reachable only by 3 thin avenues; the road extending directly southwards leading to Damanhur and the Nile Delta, the isthmus leading westward to Alexandria, and the isthmus leading eastward to Rosetta. The middle landmass and road leading southward had lake Ma'adieh/Aboukir bay on its eastern embankment, and the ancient freshwater Lake Mariout on its western embankment. (Later in 1801 the British would breach this embankment, causing the brackish seawater to flood into lake Mariouts, which hugely increased its size and cut Alexandria's most significant source of freshwater).

On 14 July a British fleet of sixty ships landed with 16,000 men under the command of Mustapha Pasha, a veteran of the last Russo-Turkish war. The Ottoman troops overran the encampment of 300 French troops near Aboukir and slaughtered them, then set siege on the fortress of Aboukir - which was garrisoned by a skeletal force of 35 French troops. These troops would surrender 3 days later. The peninsula changed hands and Ottoman flags fluttered on the bastion.

Proud of this success, Mustapha Pasha was in no hurry to march on Cairo. Murad Bey, who had managed to escape and join him, said, "The French dreaded that you could not support the presence, I watch, and they are fleeing before me." and Murad replied, "Pasha, be glad that it suits the French to withdraw because if they turned, you would disappear before them like dust before the north wind."

Napoleon previously received reports that Murad Bey was riding due north, passing the Natron lakes west of Cairo, he ordered Murat out to pursue him. But the bey returned to Giza and climbed the Pyramids, and using a mirror, "sent several signals to his wife" (who was observing him from the roof of her palace). Napoleon was not alerted by this, as the bey had only a skeleton force of Mamluks with him, and was worn out to the bone by Desaix's protracted pursuit of him through Upper Egypt over the course of the last several months (Murad had been chased squarely out of Egypt, and had been forced to seek refuge in some remote oasis' and prey on Sudanese villages south of Upper Egypt to survive). When Napoleon received (at the time he was several miles northwest of Cairo, participating in the hunt of Murad bey) a report from Marmont, then military-governor of Alexandria, on July 15, reporting that a large flotilla of English and Ottoman ships had arrived off Aboukir and disembarked 10,000 troops, Napoleon wasted no time and sent several dispatches. He ordered Murat to stop the pursuit of Murad bey and to converge to Damanhur, located 40 miles south of Aboukir. Kleber was to set out with his division from the eastern Delta for Damanhur as well, Desaix was to march down the Nile with as much of his division as possible to provide a reserve in case the Ottoman army marched on Cairo. Napoleon set out with almost all the French troops in Cairo for Damanhur as well, leaving the city to be policed and garrisoned only by his local Egyptian 'police chief', a man known as "Barthelemy". Marmont was ordered by Napoleon to remain in Alexandria with his 1,200 troops, in case the Turkish army marched upon it.Page 392

Napoleon assembled 10,000 infantry and 1,000 cavalry at Damanhur. He was greatly concerned that the Turkish army would march out of the Peninsula and attack anywhere in Egypt, so he set out immediately with his army without waiting for Kleber. He arrived near Aboukir in 24th July and was relieved to find the Ottoman army lying in wait. Napoleon had to reassess his plans; according to his intelligence, the enemy commander was the white-bearded Mustapha Pasha. A leader who had won several victories against the Russians in the previous Russo-Turkish war. This was to be a different battle than those with the Mamluks, one against a commander who had experience against European armies. Mustapha Pasha knew of Napoleon's strengths; his superlative tactics, decisiveness in speed and the imperviousness of his squares. He nullified these advantages by fortifying his army in two strong defensive lines along the peninsula, with both his flanks anchored on the shores. This protected him from flanking action, and also forced the French to attack on his own terms. Napoleon approached Abukir with the divisions of Lannes, Desaix and Murat's cavalry, 7,700 men and 1,000 horsemen, and the Turks had 15,000-18,000 men, 8,000 of whom were in a condition to fight. According to François Furet and Denis Richet ("French Revolution", Macmillan 1970, XI-14). According to Mustapha Pasha himself, corroborated by British commander Sidney Smith, this number was actually only 7,000 men.Page 396 The clash between the two armies took place near Alexandria, but the victorious French called it "the battle of Abu Qir" (or Aboukir) to avenge the former defeat of 1-3 August 1798.

Battle

Napoleon camped his army for the night of the 24th, the next morning on 25th July he ordered an attack on the Ottoman army. Mustapha Pasha arranged his army in two strongly defended lines with both flanks anchored in the shores of the peninsula. Lanusse's division was placed on the left French flank, while Lannes' division was placed on the right. Murat was in the vanguard with his cavalrymen. The Turkish fortifications and trenches on the western flank, facing Lanusse, were still unfinished, and the division under Lanusse managed to breakthrough the Turkish line after ferocious fighting. Lannuse took advantage of the rout on the Ottoman right flank to swing around and behind the left flank of the 1st enemy defensive line. This caused a widespread panic among the defending Turks on the left flank, without anywhere to retreat, many took to the water and attempted to swim to the nearest Turkish and British ships, where almost all of them drowned. According to Napoleon,

The French then proceeded to attack the 2nd Turkish line, which was strongly defended. The French attack, under bombardment from the Turkish and English ships, was repulsed, but the western side of the peninsula was poorly supported by English and Turkish ships, two impressions made by the French on the eastern side were driven back with supporting fire from the English ships.Page 365 As the French retreated, hundreds of Turks emerged from their fortifications and set in pursuit of the retreating French, beheading the corpses of dead Frenchmen. After the rout of the Turks defending the 1st line, Napoleon contemplated moving his artillery batteries to the two hills infront of the 2nd line, which was heavily defended and seemed impervious to attack. But seeing that the western bay of Aboukir extended like a cape, and moved his artillery there. This allowed the French batteries to bombard the Ottoman's right flank. The Ottomans maneuvered their right flank slightly inland, leaving a small gap in their line. At this juncture, Murat saw an opportunity with an opening in the Turkish line and numerous Ottoman soldiers emerging out of the protection of their fortifications to mutilate the French dead, and charged his cavalry at these scattered Turks. A wave of panic spread through the Turks, all the way to their defensive lines, and within minutes Murat found himself charging deep into the Turkish encampment, where he found Mustapha Pasha's tent. The Pasha emerged before Murat and fired a pistol at him, wounding him in the jaw. Murat swung his sabre at the Pasha's right hand, cutting off two of his fingers and ordered his men to seize him.

Outside the Pasha's tent, the mayhem did not cease, and the Turkish army had broke into a complete rout and thousands of soldiers were fleeing to the sea in both sides of the Peninsula. A few thousand of the Turks retreated northwards and took refuge inside the fort of Aboukir, these included the Pasha's son. The French bombarded the fort day and night, and the Turkish officers soon agreed to surrender, but their troops mutinied against this, having heard of the great slaughter of Ottoman prisoners captured by the French in the siege of Jaffa. Napoleon at this stage left for Alexandria and gave charge of the siege to Lannes. Mustapha Pasha, who was now a captive of the French, wrote multiple dispatches to the beleaguered Turks, ordering them to surrender, this was refused and the survivors of the battle swore to defend the fort to their last extremity. The Pasha's 2nd letter to the besieged Turks chided them for their continued resistance, which was spilling more blood needlessly, at this juncture the besieged Turks agreed to a ceasefire. Bertrand (French colonel in charge of the engineers) used advantage of this ceasefire to reconnoiter the fort, but a firefight broke out subsequently. The Turks sallied out of the fort and captured a few houses infront of it (there was several buildings infront of the fort), Lannes wanted to counterattack and drive them back, but he was dissuaded from this by Bertrand, who wisely stated that even if these buildings were retaken, it would cost the French more troops when the Turks try to recapture them, and advised Lannes to wait a few days until the digging of siege trenches was complete, which would force the Turkish soldiers back inside the fort, and the siege would ideally cost no casualties to the French. The Turks, encouraged by their small success, made another sortie and captured more buildings in the village on June 28. And after this, even made a sortie on French positions on Sheikh hill. Lannes could not hold back anymore and ordered an attack to drive the Turks back into the fort. During the fighting, he was wounded with a musket ball, and had to be evacuated. General Menou (military governor of Rosetta at the time) then took command of the siege. The Turks then made yet another sortie, capturing a bridgehead to the fort. Davout, who was in the siege trenches, attacked the Turks and drove them out of the village back inside the fortress. At the 30th, two batteries of heavy guns and three batteries of mortars came into action and began bombarding the fort, while at the night of the 30th French sappers began mining below the fort to mine and blow up the counterscarp. But at August 2nd, at dawn, the Turks crowded out of their fort, without any envoy of capitulation. The Turkish troops were starved, and many became delirious and half-crazed from drinking seawater over the course of the siege. After holding out for 8 days, they simply walked out en-masse and asked for mercy. Of their surrender, the French captain Charles François describes the surrender;

Aftermath

Sir Sidney Smith dispatched a letter to Horatio Nelson, on August 2nd, informing him of the defeat, writing;Page 364
The French suffered only 220 dead and 600 wounded while the Turkish losses were enormous: 2,000 dead on the battlefield, 11,000 men drowned, 5,000 prisoners of war and 2,000 missing and unaccounted for.  Napoleon would claim that "of the enemy who came ashore, not a single one escaped." This was not true, Sidney Smith dispatched some boats to rescue some of the Turks who ran into the waters. Among the Ottomans rescued from the water was thirty-years old officer of Albanian descent Muhammed Ali, who six years later would rule and transform Egypt.

On the main battlefield, the French captured 100 Ottoman banners, 32 field guns, 400 horses and three Pasha's Bunchuks (ceremonial flags issued to Pashas). The captured cannons included two small English cannons, which were presented by the King of England as a gift to Sultan Selim. These cannons were given to a French cavalry brigade. For his gallant charge and capture of the Turkish Pasha, Napoleon promoted Murat to divisional general, and gave him great credit for the victory at Aboukir. Lannes was also promoted to divisional general, and Bertrand to the rank of colonel.

Sidney Smith, leading the British flotilla, wrote the following to be "Causes of the defeat of the Ottoman army under Mustapha Pasha Serasker on the 25th July 1799;Page 367

Abukir gave the French a few months respite. Desaix continued through Upper Egypt in search of Murad Bey, who would soon accept a conditional peace with the French and ally himself with them.

Napoleon learned from the Pasha of the situation in Europe, where a large coalition was threatening France. (he had been completely in the dark regarding developments in Europe for a long time, due to the British blockade). And an envoy sent to Sidney Smith for exchanging prisoners (Napoleon wanted to send the heavily wounded Turks to the Anglo-Ottoman fleet in exchange for the captured French garrison of Aboukir), Sidney Smith then handed the French envoy appointed by Napoleon several of the latest newspapers, and verbally told the envoy that the directory had summoned Napoleon back to Paris (he had read the summons letter, which was intercepted by the British blockade, and presumably was trying to get Napoleon out of Egypt, which would ideally greatly weaken the French position in Egypt). Napoleon read these newspapers, which were more confirmation to the grave situation political situation of France in Europe, where almost all of the Italian territories he conquered were captured by the Austrians, and there was another insurrection in the Vendée. Sidney Smith would soon, for reasons that can only be understood as elaborate, lift the blockade of the Egyptian coast and take his fleet for provisioning at an allied port (he would state that his salted provisions were completely exhausted at this stage). This gave Napoleon an opening in which he would be able to escape from Egypt.

On 23 August, leaving the command to Kleber, Bonaparte embarked on the frigate Muiron in the small flotilla under the command of Ganteaume. with Berthier, Murat, Lannes and several of his savants (including his favorite, Monge). He very secretively prepared to abandon Egypt and go back to France and only informed Kleber with a letter in the very same day he departed, to the great chagrin of his troops and generals who viewed this as nothing short of betrayal (especially Kleber, who would be appalled to see the letters Napoleon dispatched to the directory, in which he minimized and downplayed the precarious conditions of the expedition. Kleber would dispatch a strong-worded letter to the directory informing them of the reality of the situation).

In the long term, a French presence in Egypt was impossible to maintain. Jean Antoine Verdier managed to defeat a 2nd Turkish amphibious assault at Damietta several months later, on 1st November, and Kleber tenuously maintained French rule over the country thanks to his victory at Heliopolis on 18 March 1800, but less than a month later he was murdered in his garden in Cairo by a student of theology. Kleber's successor, Menou, lacking the skills of a war leader, was defeated at Canopus (fought a short distance west of the battlefield of Aboukir, on the isthmus to Alexandria) and surrendered on 2 September on identical conditions that were negotiated and agreed on previously by Kleber, Sidney Smith and the Ottoman Grand Vizier, but declined and foundered by the British prime minister. Under the convention signed with the British, the French army came back to France in British ships.

The battle has become one of the greatly celebrated victories in French history. It has a plate relief on the Arc de Triomphe, and the Rue D'Aboukir in Paris was named after this victory.

See also
 Battle of the Nile or Battle of Abukir Bay (1798)
 Battle of Abukir (1801)

References

Citations

Sources 

 
 
 
  Originally published in 1895.
 
 
 
 
 
 
  Originally published in 2001 by Constable, London.

External links 
 

Conflicts in 1799
Battles of the French Revolutionary Wars
Battles involving the Ottoman Empire
1799 in France
1799 in Egypt
French campaign in Egypt and Syria
Battles inscribed on the Arc de Triomphe
Joachim Murat